Energy Murambadoro (nickname "Gokwe": born 27 June 1982 in Gweru) is a former Zimbabwean association football goalkeeper. He has retired from international football with Zimbabwe. He has two children.

Club career
On 24 November 2009 Mpumalanga Black Aces F.C. bolstered their goalkeeping department with the acquisition of Murambadoro. On 20 October 2012, he was one of sixteen players who were cleared of match fixing by the Zimbabwe Football Association.

The following are the clubs that Energy played including the years and transfers:

In 2003/2004 Energy left Caps United (Zimbabwe) and Joined Hellenics (South Africa)

In 2004/2005 Energy left Hellenics (South Africa) and Joined Bnei Sakhnin (Israel)

In 2005/2006 Energy left Joined Bnei Sakhnin (Israel) and Joined Caps United (Zimbabwe)

In 2006/2007 Energy left Caps United (Zimbabwe) and Joined Hellenics (South Africa)

In 2007/2008 Energy left Hellenics (South Africa) and Joined Caps United (Zimbabwe)

In 2008/2009 Energy left Caps United (Zimbabwe) and Joined Bidvest Wits FC (South Africa)

In 2009/2010 Energy left Bidvest Wits FC (South Africa) and Joined Black Ace (South Africa)

In 2009/2010 Energy left Black Ace (South Africa) and Joined Bidvest Wits FC (South Africa)

In 2012/2013 Energy left Bidvest Wits FC (South Africa) and from there he had no club.

In 2014/2015 Energy joined Black Ace (South Africa)In 2014/2015 Energy left Black Ace (South Africa) and AmaZulu FC (South Africa)

In 2014/2015 Energy left AmaZulu FC (South Africa) and Black Ace (South Africa)

In 2015/2016 Energy left Black Ace (South Africa) and AmaZulu FC (South Africa)

International career
He was a member of the Zimbabwean 2004 African Nations Cup team, who finished bottom of their group in the first round of competition, thus failing to secure qualification for the quarter-finals. He also participated at the 2006 African Nations Cup, with the same outcome.
Famous Zimbabwe coach Sir Derek Nicholls regarded Energy as the best goalkeeper the nation has ever seen and nicknamed him Pat in goal.

References

External links 
 

1982 births
Living people
Sportspeople from Gweru
Zimbabwean footballers
Zimbabwean expatriate footballers
Zimbabwe international footballers
Bnei Sakhnin F.C. players
Bidvest Wits F.C. players
Mpumalanga Black Aces F.C. players
Hellenic F.C. players
CAPS United players
2004 African Cup of Nations players
2006 Africa Cup of Nations players
Israeli Premier League players
Expatriate footballers in Israel
Expatriate soccer players in South Africa
Zimbabwean expatriate sportspeople in Israel
Zimbabwean expatriate sportspeople in South Africa
Association football goalkeepers